The Ugelstad Laboratory was founded at the Norwegian University of Science and Technology (NTNU), Trondheim, Norway, in January 2002 to commemorate the late Professor John Ugelstad.

The laboratory specialises in surfactant chemistry and its technical applications, emulsions and emulsion technology, preparation of polymers and polymer particles - such as the monosized microbeads - and their technical applications, plasma chemical modification of surfaces and silica-based chemistry.

Applications include crude oil production and processing, wood pulp and paper, biomedicine, catalysis and material science.

The main purpose is to raise the national level of colloidal science.

External links
 Official website

Norwegian University of Science and Technology
Research institutes in Norway
2002 establishments in Norway